Phillip "Phil" Poursanidis (born 9 May 1968) is a former Australian rules footballer who played with Carlton in the Victorian Football League (VFL).

Notes

External links

Phillip Poursanidis's profile at Blueseum

1968 births
Australian people of Greek descent
Carlton Football Club players
Living people
Australian rules footballers from Victoria (Australia)